The enzyme altronate dehydratase catalyzes the chemical reaction

D-altronate  2-dehydro-3-deoxy-D-gluconate + H2O

This enzyme belongs to the family of lyases, specifically the hydro-lyases, which cleave carbon-oxygen bonds.  The systematic name of this enzyme class is D-altronate hydro-lyase (2-dehydro-3-deoxy-D-gluconate-forming). This enzyme is also called D-altronate hydro-lyase.  This enzyme participates in pentose and glucuronate interconversions.

References

 

EC 4.2.1
Enzymes of unknown structure